The Evening Colonnade, published in 1973, is a collection of essays and reviews by the English writer and critic Cyril Connolly.

The compilation consists primarily of Connolly's articles written when he was literary critic for The Sunday Times. Other articles are taken from Harpers & Queen, the London Magazine, Art News, Art and Literature and The New York Times.

The work is divided into four sections as follows:

"Dew on the Garlic Leaf" contains mainly essays of personal experience, starting with a continuation of the autobiographical element of Enemies of Promise
"Divers of Worship" comprises mainly reviews of works associated with past writers
"Nothing if not Critical" includes reviews of contemporary writers of the modern movement
"The House of Two Doors" consists of articles about topics other than writers

Connolly derived the title from Pope's poem on Lady Mary Wortley Montagu:
"What are the gay parterre, the chequer'd shade
The morning bower, the ev'ning colonnade
But soft recesses of uneasy minds
To sigh unheard in, to the passing winds?"
He also had in mind the surrealist work of Chirico.

References
Cyril Connolly The Evening Colonnade Harcourt, Brace, Jovanovich 1973

English essay collections
1973 non-fiction books
Works by Cyril Connolly
Books of literary criticism
Works originally published in The Sunday Times
Works originally published in Harper's Bazaar
Works originally published in The London Magazine
Works originally published in The New York Times